Catherine Bott (born 11 September 1952) is a British soprano and a Baroque specialist. She has also pursued a broadcasting career.

Following her studies at The King's High School For Girls and Guildhall School of Music and Drama, with Arthur Reckless, she began her career as a member of the English Baroque-jazz crossover group, The Swingle Singers (then called "Swingle II"). By 1980 she had begun appearing frequently in the New London Consort and thereafter began performing across the world in Europe, Latin America and the USSR with several other period-instrument groups.

She has recorded extensively, for example as Dido in Purcell's Dido and Aeneas (with Christopher Hogwood and the Academy of Ancient Music in 1994), with the choir of King's College, Cambridge conducted by Stephen Cleobury in Bach's St. John Passion, as Venus in John Blow's Venus and Adonis with Philip Pickett, and in Monteverdi's L'Incoronazione di Poppea with Sir John Eliot Gardiner.  She also vocalized on Trevor Jones's score for The Dark Crystal.

Bott has been used by conductors to perform and record more recent repertoire, for example with Sir John Eliot Gardiner in Fauré's Requiem, Vaughan Williams' Sinfonia Antartica, Nielsen's Symphony No. 3 with Bryden Thomson and the London Symphony Orchestra and Royal Scottish National Orchestra respectively. She is also in demand among contemporary composers such as Michael Nyman and Jonathan Dove.

With Lucie Skeaping and Hannah French, Bott has been a presenter of The Early Music Show on BBC Radio 3 and has also presented Radio 3's Live in Concert. In October 2013, Bott joined Classic FM to present a three-year project covering the entire history of classical music.
She currently presents a three-hour programme on Classic FM every Sunday between 1.00 and 4.00 p.m. She can also be heard as a presenter for performances on the Wigmore Hall website.

Notes

External links

Catherine Bott on Classic FM

1952 births
Alumni of the Guildhall School of Music and Drama
BBC Radio 3 presenters
British performers of early music
Women performers of early music
English operatic sopranos
Living people
People educated at The King's High School for Girls
British radio presenters
British women radio presenters
20th-century British women opera singers
21st-century British women opera singers